Sir Herbert Miles Road is an eastern coastal road in the British Overseas Territory of Gibraltar. It was a new road in 1917 replacing a track that previously gave access to Catalan Bay. The Caleta Hotel and La Mamela Restaurant lie along this road. At the Caleta Hotel, Sir Herbert Miles Road overlooks Catalan Bay.

References

Streets in Gibraltar